Eurybela trophoessa is a moth in the family Crambidae. It was described by Turner in 1908. It is found in Australia, where it has been recorded from Queensland and New South Wales.

References

Moths described in 1908
Spilomelinae